Casino Cosmopol is a Swedish company, a subsidiary of Svenska Spel, owning three casinos. All the profit of the company goes to the national treasury of Sweden.

It was in 1999 in the old Customs House, Gothenburg (now Casino Cosmopol) that it was decided to open four state-involved casinos.

The four casinos opened in:
Sundsvall opened on July 1, 2001 - closed in 2020
Malmö opened on December 8, 2001 
Gothenburg opened on August 31, 2002 
Stockholm opened on March 13, 2003

Locations 
The casino at Sundsvall was Sweden's first international casino, opened in July 2001. It was housed in the refurbished old central railway station built in 1874. In 2012 it was voted Europe's best casino,  but it was closed in 2020 since it wasn't profitable. 

In Malmö in Skåne County, the casino is located in the centre of the city in Kungsparken, and was opened in December 2001. Kungsparken is a large park that surrounds Malmö Castle.

The casino in Gothenburg was opened at the end of August 2002. It is housed in the old Customs House at Packhusplatsen.  The building had earlier been used as a poker lounge and had a seating area called Losers lounge.

In March 2003 the fourth casino was opened in central Stockholm. The casino is located near the Kungsbron (King's bridge) - a continuation of the long street Kungsgatan (King's road).  The casino in Stockholm offers table games as well as poker cash-game with limits 10/10 (min buy-in 100/1000) and up to 100/100 (min buy-in 5000-10000).

References

External links 
Company website

Gambling companies of Sweden
Government-owned companies of Sweden
Companies based in Solna Municipality